The Agence de coopération culturelle et technique (ACCT, French for Agency of cultural and technical cooperation) was founded in 1970 and was the precursor to what is now the Organisation internationale de la Francophonie. Canadian Jean-Louis Roy was the first, and only, secretary-general of the organization from 1989 until 1997.

References

Organizations established in 1970
Intergovernmental organizations established by treaty
Organisation internationale de la Francophonie